Paulet Island is a circular island about  in diameter, lying  south-east of Dundee Island, off the north-eastern end of the Antarctic Peninsula.  Because of its large penguin colony, it is a popular destination for sightseeing tours.

Description
The island is composed of lava flows capped by a cinder cone with a small summit crater. Geothermal heat keeps parts of the island ice-free, and the youthful morphology of the volcano suggests that it was last active within the last 1,000 years. The island is part of the James Ross Island Volcanic Group.

Historic monuments
Paulet Island was discovered by a British expedition (1839–1843) under James Clark Ross and named by him for Captain the Right Honorable Lord George Paulet, Royal Navy.

In 1903 during the Swedish Antarctic Expedition led by Otto Nordenskiöld his ship Antarctic was crushed and sunk by the ice off the coast of the island. A stone hut built in February 1903 by shipwreck survivors, together with the grave of an expedition member, and the cairn built on the highest point of the island to draw the attention of rescuers, have been designated a Historic Site or Monument (HSM 41), following a proposal by Argentina and the United Kingdom to the Antarctic Treaty Consultative Meeting. The shipwrecked crew of the Endurance original plan was to travel to the island and use stores there that were left by the above Swedish Expedition but the ice pack that they were stranded on eventually drifted too far east.

Important Bird Area
The island has been identified as an Important Bird Area (IBA) by BirdLife International because it supports a very large breeding colony of about 100,000 pairs of Adélie penguins.  Other birds known to nest on the island include imperial shags, snow petrels and kelp gulls.

Gallery

See also 
 List of Antarctic and subantarctic islands
 List of volcanoes in Antarctica

References

Bibliography
 Antarctica. Sydney: Reader's Digest, 1985, pp. 152–159.
 Child, Jack. Antarctica and South American Geopolitics: Frozen Lebensraum. New York: Praeger  Publishers, 1988, pp. 69, 72.
 Lonely Planet, Antarctica: a Lonely Planet Travel Survival Kit, Oakland, CA: Lonely Planet Publications, 1996, 302.
 Stewart, Andrew, Antarctica: An Encyclopedia. London: McFarland and Co., 1990 (2 volumes), p 752.
 U.S. National Science Foundation, Geographic Names of the Antarctic, Fred G. Alberts, ed. Washington: NSF, 1980.

External links 
 More information about Paulet Island
 Picture of Paulet Island with thousands of Antarctic Penguins
 Another picture of Paulet Island
 Comprehensive Report about Paulet Island with a lot of pictures

Mountains of Graham Land
Volcanoes of Graham Land
Landforms of Graham Land
Active volcanoes
Islands of the Joinville Island group
Important Bird Areas of Antarctica
Seabird colonies
Historic Sites and Monuments of Antarctica
Penguin colonies